Laura López Ventosa (born 13 January 1988) is a Spanish female water polo player. At the 2012 Summer Olympics, she competed for the Spain women's national water polo team in the women's event, where they won the silver medal. She is  inches tall.

See also
 List of Olympic medalists in water polo (women)
 List of world champions in women's water polo
 List of World Aquatics Championships medalists in water polo

Notes

References

External links
 

1988 births
Living people
Sportspeople from Madrid
Spanish female water polo players
Water polo drivers
Water polo players at the 2012 Summer Olympics
Water polo players at the 2016 Summer Olympics
Medalists at the 2012 Summer Olympics
Olympic silver medalists for Spain in water polo
World Aquatics Championships medalists in water polo
Water polo players from the Community of Madrid
21st-century Spanish women